Dilip Rasiklal Doshi  (born 22 December 1947) is a former Indian cricketer of Gujarati origin who played in 33 Test matches and 15 One Day Internationals from 1979 to 1983.

Doshi is one of only four Test bowlers that played their first Test after the age of thirty, yet went on to take more than 100 wickets, the other three being Clarrie Grimmett, Saeed Ajmal and Ryan Harris.

In Test Cricket
Doshi was already in his 30s when he made his Test debut at Chennai, against Australia in September 1979). Having waited for so long, he wasted no time making his presence felt: with figures of 6/103 and 2/64 he was India's best bowler in the match. He continued to perform well in the series and in the final test match at Bombay, he was one of the heroes of an India victory with figures of 5/43 and 3/60. But perhaps, his greatest joy came, when he took 4/92 at Eden Garden, Calcutta, his (adopted) home town, in front of  a70,000 strong crowd.

After this series, Doshi's place in the Indian Test team became permanent. Unfortunately, in the next few years hr failed to emerge as regular match winning bowler in the international level. He was accurate and consistent, but failed to show the killing instincts. His only match winning effort after the Aussie series came at Bombay, against England, in 1981–82. His 5/39, helped India gain a vital first innings lead in a low scoring match. The emergence of Maninder Singh during the 1982–83 season hastened the end of Doshi's test career.Unreferenced. Please don't add again without reliable and published third-party sources

Career Test Bowling performances against other countries:

Doshi is considered one of the worst batsmen in Test cricket history, with a batting average of only 4.60. Doshi holds the record for the most Test Match innings in a career without ever batting above someone else in the order, with 38 innings batting at number 11 in the order.

In ODIs
Doshi made his ODI debut during the 1980–81 tour of Australia. At Gabba, against NZ, he produced his best figures of 4/30. Both his average 23.81 and RPO(3.96) in ODIs are impressive. But, he wasn't the most mobile of fielders, and with him being a real rabbit with the bat, he played only 15 ODIs for India. All-rounder Ravi Shastri was preferred to him for the 1983 WC.

In first-class cricket
Though Doshi made his first class debut with Saurashtra, he played most of his Ranji Trophy cricket with Bengal. It was for Bengal that he achieved the remarkable figures of 6 wickets for 6 runs against Assam in 1974. Overall, his long Ranji Trophy career shows 318 wickets at an impressive average of 18.33.

He also played first class cricket for Nottinghamshire and Warwickshire in the English midlands. Overall, his first class career shows 898 wickets at 26.58 a piece. 

In March 1983, he led a West Bengal side for a short tour of Dhaka. In the 3-day match, he led his side to an emphatic win with figures of 7/39 & 5/74. The guile of his spin was too much for the Bangladeshi batsmen. He took 3/27(from 9 overs) in the 45 over match.

The unfortunate trio
Throughout the late 1960s and 1970s, three left arm spinners dominated the Indian domestic cricket scene. Along with Doshi there were, Padmakar Shivalkar from Bombay, & Rajinder Goel of Haryana & Delhi. Goel still holds the record for the highest number of wickets in the Ranji Trophy (640 at 17.14). Shivlakar holds the record for his team Mumbai. Years after years, they destroyed strong batting line ups in Indian cricket with the guile of their spin, only to be overlooked by the national selectors. The only reason was the presence of B.S. Bedi. With a world class left arm spinner readily available, the selectors were reluctant to give the others much chance. Thus, Shivalker and Goel had to content themselves with a few unofficial test matches against Sri Lanka. Goel was specially unlucky, in the sense that he was originally selected to make his official Test Debut against WI at Delhi, in 1974–78. But a last minute change saw off spinner Venkat replacing him. Doshi, in that sense, can be considered to be the luckiest; at least he got the chance to represent India in full internationals. Nevertheless, he too lost the best years of his playing career waiting for his chance to come.

See also
 List of India cricketers who have taken five-wicket hauls on Test debut

References

1947 births
Living people
India Test cricketers
India One Day International cricketers
Indian cricketers
East Zone cricketers
Bengal cricketers
Nottinghamshire cricketers
Warwickshire cricketers
Saurashtra cricketers
Vazir Sultan Tobacco cricketers
People from Rajkot
Cricketers from Gujarat
Hertfordshire cricketers
Northumberland cricketers
Indian Universities cricketers
Cricketers who have taken five wickets on Test debut
Gujarati people
D. B. Close's XI cricketers
T. N. Pearce's XI cricketers